V. Abdurahiman is an Indian politician, (born 5 June 1962 in Tirur) currently serving as the Minister for Fisheries,Harbour engineering, Fisheries University,Sports, Wakf and Haj Pilgrimage, Posts & Telegraphs, Railways, Government of Kerala. He became the MLA from Tanur in 15th Kerala Legislative Assembly.

Early life
V. Abdurahiman is professionally a businessman and is married to Smt.Shajida Rahman. His birthplace is Pookayil, Tirur, a town in Malappuram district in the Indian state of Kerala.

Politics
Abdurahiman was a Congress Leader.He served as a Municipal Councilor in Tirur Municipality for 15 years. He held various positions including Kerala Pradesh Congress Committee executive committee member and former vice-chairman in Tirur Municipal Council. Later he left Indian National Congress.

In the 2014 Indian general election, he contested at Ponnani constituency as an LDF independent candidate and was defeated by the sitting MP E. T. Muhammed Basheer. In the 2016 Kerala Legislative Assembly election, he won from Tanur constituency as a LDF independent candidate. In 2021, he retained the seat as a LDF Independent.

Controversy 
In November 2020, Abdurahiman made an alleged anti-tribal remark during a press conference against Tirur MLA C Mammutty, inviting protests from tribal activists in Kerala. In January 2023, he dragged himself into a controversy after making a comment on the government’s decision to impose an 8% entertainment tax on tickets for the India-Sri Lanka one-day international hosted  at the Karyavattom cricket ground. He said that those starving and hard-pressed to afford the tax on tickets best skip the match. This sparked a controversy.

References

Living people
Indian National League politicians
Kerala MLAs 2016–2021
1962 births
Indian National Congress politicians from Kerala